The Chairman of the Legislative Assembly of Zabaikalsky Krai is the presiding officer of that legislature.

Office-holders

Sources 

Lists of legislative speakers in Russia
Politics of Zabaykalsky Krai